Honky Tonk Angel is the third studio album by American country music artist Patty Loveless. With five tracks from the album charting in the Billboard Top Ten Country Singles, including two at #1, it served as a breakthrough album for Loveless. The album itself was Loveless' highest charting at #7 on the Country Albums category. The two #1 singles were "Chains" and "Timber, I'm Falling in Love". Loveless also did a cover of the Lone Justice song, "Don't Toss Us Away", which featured Rodney Crowell on backing vocals. The song charted at #5. Famed songwriter Kostas had a major role by writing three of the album's tunes, including "Timber, I'm Falling in Love" and "The Lonely Side of Love", which peaked at #6.

Track listing

Personnel
Drums, percussion: Eddie Bayers
Bass guitar: Leland Sklar
Keyboards: Matt Rollings
Acoustic guitar: Mac McAnally
Electric guitar: Albert Lee
Mandolin: Albert Lee, Mark O'Connor
Steel guitar: Paul Franklin
Dobro: Paul Franklin
Fiddle: Mark O'Connor
Lead vocals: Patty Loveless
Background vocals: Rodney Crowell, Vince Gill, Patty Loveless, Claire Lynch, Harry Stinson 
Produced By Tony Brown
Pre-Production By Don Lanier
Mixing By Bob Bullock & John Guess
Engineered By Chuck Ainlay, Bob Bullock & Marty Williams

Charts

Weekly charts

Year-end charts

Certifications

References

External links
Yahoo! Music information on Honky Tonk Angel - Accessed January 4, 2007.

1988 albums
Patty Loveless albums
MCA Records albums
Albums produced by Tony Brown (record producer)